Virgilio Pereyra (born 30 May 1928) is a Uruguayan cyclist. He competed in the individual and team road race events at the 1952 Summer Olympics.

References

External links
 

1928 births
Possibly living people
Uruguayan male cyclists
Olympic cyclists of Uruguay
Cyclists at the 1952 Summer Olympics